Department is a 2012 Indian Hindi-language action film directed by Ram Gopal Varma. The film stars Amitabh Bachchan, Sanjay Dutt and Rana Daggubati in lead roles. Released on 18 May 2012, the film received mixed-to-negative reviews from critics, and proved to be a commercial disaster at the box office.

Plot
When Inspector Mahadev Bhosale (Sanjay Dutt) was asked by his seniors to form a hit squad called the "Department" to take on the Mumbai underworld, he recruited Shiv Narayan (Rana Daggubati), an honest and brave police officer who had been suspended for an encounter killing. Together, Mahadev and Shiv, along with others in the "Department", took on the underworld don Sawatya (Vijay Raaz) and his gang. Sawatya, in spite of many exhortations by his number two, D.K. (Abhimanyu Singh), and D.K.'s feisty girlfriend, Naseer (Madhu Shalini), does not hit back at the police.

There is also the gangster-turned-minister, Sarjerao Gaikwad (Amitabh Bachchan), who takes Shiv under his wing after he saves his life at a public rally. Mahadev warns Shiv that Sarjerao is just using him. After an inevitable turn of events, it is exposed that Mahadev is working for Mohammad Ghouri, who is an underworld don, and is, at the ganglord's behest, finishing off Sawatya's gang. While Shiv declines to be a part of Mahadev's corrupt world, and Mahadev agrees to let him be, things start falling apart between the mentor and the apprentice when Shiv starts taking on a sub-gang formed by D.K., under Mahadev's protection.

Cast
 Amitabh Bachchan as Sarjerao Gaikwad, a gangster-turned-politician
 Sanjay Dutt as Inspector Mahadev Bhosle, the DSP of an encounter squad
 Rana Daggubati as Inspector Shivnarayan, an encounter specialist
 Vijay Raaz as Sawatya, a crime boss
 Abhimanyu Singh as DK, Sawatya's right-hand man
 Deepak Tijori as Inspector Danaji, an honest member of the department
 Lakshmi Manchu as Satya Bhosle, Mahadev's wife
 Anjana Sukhani as Bharati, Shivnarayan's wife
 Madhu Shalini as Naseer, DK's gun-loving girlfriend
 Neeraj Vora in a dual role as Lalchand and Valchand
 Nathalia Kaur as item number "Dan Dan"

Soundtrack

The soundtrack is composed by Bappa Lahiri along with Dharam-Sandeep and Vikram Magi. The music received negative reviews worldwide.

Box office

References

External links

Ram Gopal Varma's 'Department': Clash of the titans – Movies News – Bollywood – ibnlive

2010s Hindi-language films
2012 action thriller films
2012 crime thriller films
Indian crime action films
Indian crime thriller films
2012 films
2012 crime action films
Films directed by Ram Gopal Varma
Fictional portrayals of the Maharashtra Police
Indian gangster films
Indian action thriller films
Viacom18 Studios films